Degaon is a village in Belgaum district in the southern state of Karnataka, India. It is famous for Kadamba style Kamala Narayana Temple. The place name might have Originated from its temples. Devagram or Degaon meaning a village of Gods.

References

Villages in Belagavi district